Centaurea akamantis, the Akamas centaurea, is a species of flowering plant in the family Asteraceae. It is found only in Cyprus. Its natural habitat is Mediterranean-type shrubby vegetation. It is threatened by habitat loss.

It was first published and described in Willdenowia Vol.23 on page 157 in 1993.

References

akamantis
Endemic flora of Cyprus
Critically endangered plants
Critically endangered flora of Asia
Critically endangered biota of Europe
Taxonomy articles created by Polbot
Plants described in 1993